Gorgany is a mountain range in Western Ukraine in Outer Eastern Carpathians, adjacent to Chornohora range. The highest peak of Gorgany is Syvulia (1,836 m) with the other high peaks including Ihrovyshche,  (1,804 m),  (1,772 m) and Grofa. The mountains are made of flysch rock, mostly sandstone, which create typical for Gorgany debris fields (local names: gorgan, grekhot). They are bordered by the Mizunka River and Vyshkiv Pass in the west and the Prut River and Yablunytsia Pass in the east.

Gorgany are the least populated part of the Ukrainian Carpathians. The western parts of Gorgany are inhabited by Boykos, whose primary occupation is herding and timber exploitation. The major towns in the area include Vorokhta and Yaremche.

Sources
https://gorgany.if.ua/ - official page
 Gorgany Race — 30-hour Adventure Race happening every year in Gorgany
 Gorgany

Maps

Mountain ranges of the Eastern Carpathians
Mountain ranges of Ukraine
Primeval Beech Forests in Europe